A list of films produced in Argentina in 1969:

External links and references
 Argentine films of 1969 at the Internet Movie Database

1969
Films
Argentine